Roberta Alexandra Mary Taylor (née Roberts; born 26 February 1948) is an English actress and author. She is known for her roles of Irene Raymond in EastEnders (1997–2000), and Inspector Gina Gold in The Bill (2002–2008).

Career
Taylor worked in the theatre and appeared at the Glasgow Citizens Theatre from 1980 to 1992. During that period, she played La Duchesse de Guermantes in a stage adaptation of Marcel Proust's A la recherche du temps perdu (Remembrance of Things Past) entitled A Waste of Time, in which Rupert Everett and Gary Oldman were also in the cast. She was also seen in Noël Coward's Design for Living, Oscar Wilde's  A Woman of No Importance and An Ideal Husband. She was the Princess Kosmonopolis in Tennessee Williams'  Sweet Bird of Youth in 1992, and in 1995 played the Nurse in Shakespeare's Romeo and Juliet at the Lyric Hammersmith.

She has also appeared in episodes of the television series Doctors, Sharman, Holby City, Silent Witness and Inspector Morse. She has appeared as a guest on The Paul O'Grady Show and in the films The Witches (1990) and Tom & Viv (1994). She has also appeared as herself on Lily Savage's Blankety Blank.

In 2005 she played Mrs Pardiggle in the BBC's drama serial adaptation of Charles Dickens' Bleak House. In 2009, she starred as the long-suffering Phoebe Rice in John Osborne's play The Entertainer at the Royal Exchange Theatre in Manchester. In 2011 she appeared in the West End revival of Pygmalion, alongside Rupert Everett, Kara Tointon and Diana Rigg. On 23 September 2017 Taylor made a guest appearance on Casualty her first television appearance since 2013.

Personal life

Born out of wedlock to Robert Alexander Archer, an already married bus conductor, Taylor was brought up by her mother Winifred Roberts, aunts, and grandmother.

She married Victor Taylor on 1 April 1966. The couple divorced in the early 1970s and had a son.

Taylor met fellow actor Peter Guinness whilst working with the Glasgow Citizens Theatre. They married in September 1996 after having been together for twenty years. Guinness appeared in a few episodes of The Bill as her lover in 2007.

Whilst filming The Bill, she developed a close off-screen friendship to fellow actor Alex Walkinshaw (PC Dale "Smithy" Smith) and is godmother to his children.

Books
Alongside her acting career, Taylor is an author. Her first book, Too Many Mothers, a memoir of her childhood, was published in October 2005. She was criticised by two cousins for some of the content in the book, with one of the cousins claiming that she was "too flippant about traumatic events in his difficult past". She refused to remove any of the content prior to publication, and later walked away from one of them at a book signing. Her first novel, The Reinvention of Ivy Brown, was published in November 2008.

Filmography
 Luther – Celia Lavender (2019)
 Shakespeare & Hathaway: Private Investigators – Gloria Fonteyn (2018–present)
 The Foreigner – Mrs Taylor (2017)
 Casualty – Margie Mogford (2017)
 Viceroy's House – Miss Reading (2017)
 Father Brown – Sister Paul (2013)
 The Bill – Inspector Gina Gold (2002–2008)
 Bleak House – Mrs Pardiggle (2005)
 M.I.T.: Murder Investigation Team – Inspector Gina Gold (2003)
 Holby City – Karen Lake (2002)
 Doctors – Rachel Whiting (2001)
 EastEnders – Irene Raymond (1997–2000)
 The Passion – Jane (1999)
 The Knock – Ms Gardiner (1997)
 Silent Witness – Dr de Groot (1997)
 Sharman – Aggie (1996)
 Dangerfield – Mrs Weatherall (1995)
 The Turnaround – Aggie (1995)
 Tom and Viv – Ottoline Morrell (1994)
 In Suspicious Circumstances – Violette Kaye (1994)
 Minder – Pat Norris (1991)
 The Witches – Chef Witch (1990)
 The Bill– Angie Purser (1990)
 One Way Out – Athene (1989)
 Inspector Morse – Sheila Williams (1987)
 Wolcott – Mrs Godden (1981)
 Lady Killers – Roberta Martin (1980)

References

External links
 

English television actresses
English soap opera actresses
English stage actresses
1948 births
Living people
Actresses from London
People from West Ham
People from Plaistow, Newham
Labour Party (UK) people